Mimiptera fulvella is a species of beetle in the family Cerambycidae, the only species in the genus Mimiptera.

References

Lepturinae